MBK Ružomberok is a women's basketball club in Ružomberok. It was established in 1941 and plays in the elite leagues since 1979 (then in Czechoslovakia). It is the most successful female basketball team in Slovak history. It won three Czechoslovak and 11 Slovak league titles and two EuroLeague Women titles in 1999 and 2000 when Natália Hejková was with the team as its manager (trainer).

Winners
 EuroLeague Women(2): 1999, 2000.
 Slovak Women's Basketball Extraliga(10): 1993-2003, 2020, 2021 
 Slovak Women's Basketball Cup(2): 1997, 2019.
 Czechoslovak Women's Basketball Championship(3):1991-1993.

Current roster

Notable players

  Iveta Bieliková
  Klaudia Lukačovičová
  Slávka Bučáková
  Mária Felixová
  Janka Minčíková
  Katarína Tetemondová
   Lara Mandić

External links
Official site
FIBA team page

Ružomberok
Women's basketball teams in Slovakia
Basketball teams established in 1941
1941 establishments in Czechoslovakia
Sport in Žilina Region